Gabriele Gibilterra (born 1 January 2000) is an Italian professional footballer who plays as a winger.

Club career
Born in Syracuse, Gibilterra started his career in Genoa youth system. For the 2018–19 season, he was loaned to Serie C club Albissola. He made his professional debut on 14 October 2018 against Piacenza.

On 5 October 2019, he signed with Serie D club Foggia as a free agent.

After one season, on 29 October 2020 he joined Serie D club Robur Siena.

On 12 August 2021, he returned to Serie C and signed with Lucchese.

References

External links
 
 

2000 births
Living people
People from Syracuse, Sicily
Footballers from Sicily
Italian footballers
Association football wingers
Serie C players
Serie D players
Genoa C.F.C. players
S.P.A.L. players
Albissola 2010 players
Calcio Foggia 1920 players
A.C.N. Siena 1904 players
Lucchese 1905 players
Sportspeople from the Province of Syracuse